Term of Trial is a novel by British author James Barlow, first published in 1961 by Hamish Hamilton. The story is divided between a school environment and a courtroom, after a weak alcoholic schoolteacher is accused of indecently assaulting a female pupil. The book was adapted for a film the following year.

Plot

Graham Weir is a middle-aged schoolteacher at Railway Street Secondary School. A timid self-loathing alcoholic, he is taunted and despised by his pupils, his colleagues and his wife. Recognizing a like-minded soul in one of his pupils he takes her under his wing and offers to give her extra tuition. Before long the girl claims to have fallen in love with him and attempts to lead him into an affair. Surprised, Weir fends off her unwelcome advances as gently as possible and disengages himself from her. However, following an accusation by the pupil, he is later charged with indecent assault and is forced to defend himself in court, not only from the criminal charge itself but also from the derision and lack of empathy that surrounds him.

Film adaptation
Term of Trial is the film adaptation, released in 1962, directed by Peter Glenville and starring Laurence Olivier, Simone Signoret, Sarah Miles and Terence Stamp.

References

1961 British novels
Social realism
Novels by James Barlow
British novels adapted into films
Hamish Hamilton books